Margrit Knabenhans (born 20 May 1935) is a Swiss former breaststroke swimmer. She competed in the women's 200 metre breaststroke at the 1952 Summer Olympics.

References

External links
 

1935 births
Living people
Olympic swimmers of Switzerland
Swimmers at the 1952 Summer Olympics
Place of birth missing (living people)
Swiss female breaststroke swimmers
20th-century Swiss women